Animal Husbandry Labelling is the planned mandatory labelling of the living conditions of livestock animals originating in Germany. The Greens-led German ministry of agriculture, BMEL, is planning its introduction via a German Act on Animal Husbandry Labelling.

Cabinet draft 
The cabinet draft stipulates that only animal products need to be labelled that both originate in Germany and are also sold in Germany. Animal Husbandry Labelling is to be phased in gradually, starting with pig meat.

Only the living conditions during the "productive period" must be indicated. For meat, this refers to the fattening period, and ignores living conditions during piglet and sow rearing. The draft distinguishes the following five living conditions (from best to worst):

 Organic,
 Outdoor runs/free-range,
 Indoor with fresh air,
 Indoor+space,
 Indoor housing.

Criticism 
In the Bundesrat discussion of the cabinet draft, Peter Hauk of the Christian Democrat opposition argued that the labelling requirement disadvantages German producers compared to foreign ones. The Bundesrat demanded that foreign producers also be forced to use the label. However, such a requirement would be at odds with EU and WTO law. The planned label can be used voluntarily by foreign producers.

See also 

 Animal welfare labelling

References 

Scholz cabinet
Animal welfare and rights in Germany